Nippon Paint Super Singer 6 was a 2018-2018 Indian Tamil language Reality singing competition show, the sixth season of the Super Singer show, which aired on Star Vijay on every Saturday and Sunday at 19:00 (IST) starting from 21 January 2018  until 15 July 2018. Nippon Paint sponsored the season after Airtel discontinued its sponsoring.  The show was hosted by Ma Ka Pa and Priyanka. The Judges of the show were the popular playback singers P. Unnikrishnan, Anuradha Sriram, Shweta Mohan and Benny Dayal. The Grand finale was held on 15 July 2018 and was a live telecast through Star Vijay. Golden voice Rakshitha, Sreekanth, Shakthi, Anirudh, Malavika and Senthil Ganesh were the final 6 contestants. Folk singer Senthil Ganesh emerged as the title winner of the show who also got a chance to sing in A.R. Rahman's music and the versatile singer Golden voice of super singer 6 Rakshitha emerged as first runner up with 25 lakhs and a title golden voice of the season and  Sreekanth impressed A. R. Rahman sir by his set final performance and got a chance to sing in his music. Malavika emerged as 2nd runners up with cash price of 3lakhs.

Hosts
Priyanka Deshpande
Ma Ka Pa Anand

Main Judges
 P. Unnikrishnan
 Anuradha Sriram
 Shweta Mohan
 Benny Dayal

Main Competition 
The winner of this season was Senthil Ganesh and the first runner up was Rakshita Suresh and the second runner up was Malavika Rajesh Vaidiya, whereas the other finalists includes Suswaram Anirudh , Sreekanth Hariharan , Sakthi Amaran

References

External links
Vijay TV Official Website on Hotstar
 

Star Vijay original programming
2018 Tamil-language television series debuts
2018 Tamil-language television seasons
Tamil-language singing talent shows
Tamil-language reality television series
Tamil-language television shows
2018 Tamil-language television series endings
Television shows set in Tamil Nadu
Airtel Super Singer seasons